Mahesh Saheba (5 September 1932 – 18 March 2006) was an Indian cricketer. He was a right-handed batsman who played for Gujarat. He was born in Ahmedabad and died in Gujarat.

Saheba made a single first-class appearance for the side, during the 1960–61 season, against Maharashtra. From the opening order, he scored 12 runs in the only innings in which he batted.

Saheba's brother, Ashok, and son Amish played first-class cricket, while his nephew Samrat, played one-day cricket.

External links
Mahesh Saheba at CricketArchive 

1932 births
2006 deaths
Indian cricketers
Gujarat cricketers